Ernani Joson Cuenco (May 10, 1936 – June 11, 1988) was a Filipino composer, film scorer, musical director, music teacher and Philippine National Artist for Music. He wrote an outstanding and memorable body of works that resonate with the Filipino sense of musicality and which embody an ingenious voice that raises the aesthetic dimensions of contemporary Filipino music. Cuenco played with the Filipino Youth Symphony Orchestra and the Manila Symphony Orchestra from 1960 to 1968, and the Manila Chamber Soloists from 1966 to 1970. He completed a music degree in piano and cello from the University of Santo Tomas where he also taught for decades until his death in 1988.

He was proclaimed National Artist for Music in 1999; He was an award-winning film scorer in the early 1960s, working in collaboration with National Artist for Music Levi Celerio. He was also a teacher and a seasoned orchestra player.

His  songwriting credits include "Nahan, Kahit na Magtiis," and "Diligin Mo ng Hamog ang Uhaw na Lupa," "Pilipinas, Inang Bayan," "Isang Dalangin," "Kalesa," "Bato sa Buhangin" and "Gaano Ko Ikaw Kamahal." The latter song shows how Cuenco enriched the Filipino love ballad by adding the elements of kundiman to it.

Biography 

Composer, film scorer, musical director and music teacher, Ernani J. Cuenco was hailed as a National Artist in Music in 1999. His works embody a Filipino sense of musicality, and the classical sound of the kundiman is evident in some of his ballads. Up to this day, his compositions are popular and well-loved.

On May 10, 1936, Cuenco was born to Feliz Cuenco and Maria Joson in Malolos, Bulacan. As a boy, he was encouraged to learn the violin and was mentored by his mother, his godmother Doña Belen Aldaba Bautista and his first teacher, Jovita Tantoco. He finished his elementary studies at the Immaculata Academy of Malolos in 1948, then went on to study at the University of Santo Tomas High School. He earned his bachelor's degree in Music, Major in Piano at the University of Santo Tomas Conservatory of Music in 1956. He got a scholarship grant at the UST in the same year and studied the cello under Professor Modesto Marquiz, finishing in 1965. In 1968, he completed his master's degree in Music at the Sta. Isabel College in Manila.

From 1960 to 1968, he was a cellist at the Manila Symphony Orchestra under Dr. Hubert Zipper and played for the Filipino Youth Symphony Orchestra. He also played for the Manila Chamber Soloists from 1966 to 1970. His career as a musical director began in 1960 when he was discovered by Joseph Estrada playing as part of a band Cuenco formed with friends at an exclusive restaurant in Makati. In 1963, Cuenco was sent as a delegate to the International Music Conference in Tokyo, Japan. Aside from being a composer and musical director, he was also a music teacher at the UST until his death on June 11, 1988.

Musical Compositions
 "Nahan"
 "Kahit na Magtiis"
 "Diligin Mo ng Hamog ang Uhaw na Lupa"
 "Pilipinas, Inang Bayan"
 "Isang Dalangin"
 "Kalesa"
 "Bato sa Buhangin"
 "Gaano Ko Ikaw Kamahal"
 "Isang Dalangin"
 "Nag-iisa Sa Pagluha"
 "Sa Bawat Sandali"
 "Ganyan Pala ang Pag-ibig"
 "Bulong ng Puso"
 "Bakit Tayo Isinilang"
 "Lualhati sa Diyos"
 "Pilipinas, Inang Bayan"
 "Kundiman ‘86"
 "Sampaguita"
 "Gunita"
 "Hangin"
 "Tunay na Pag-giliw"

 "Balikbayan"

 "Aking Inay"
 "Habang Ako Ma’y Buhay"

 "Ang Babaing Pinagtaksilan ng Panahon"

Awards and recognition

Metro Film Festival Awards, 1971
Rajah Soliman Award, 1972
11th Manila Film Festival "Best Musical Scoring" for El Vibora
Rajah Soliman Award 1973
18th Manila Film Festival "Best Musical Scoring" for Ang Mahiwagang Daigdig ni Pedro Penduko
14th Pista ng mga Pelikulang Pilipino, Best Music, Hanggang sa Kabila ng Daigdig, 1973
Metro Film Festival Awards, 1974

'FAMAS Awards
Best Musical Score, Diligin Mo Ng Hamog ang Uhaw na Lupa, 1975
Best Original Theme Song, "Bato sa Buhangin''", 1977
Best Musical Score, Bakya Mo Neneng, 1977

*Hiyas ng Bulacan Award, Most Outstanding Bulakenyo Award

Ben Tupas Award, UST Alumni Association, 1978

Gawad URIAN Award for Aliw-iw, 1979

*Outstanding Bulakenyo Award, 1980

UST High School Alumni Association, Outstanding Alumni Award for Music, 1982

Central Student Council, UST, CSC Hall of Recognition Award in Music, 1985

Development Council of State Colleges and Universities Region III; Center for Inter-Institutional Research and Policy Studies, Bigkis Sining Award for Music as Performing Arts, 1985

Outstanding Thomasian Awardee, UST Alumni Association, 1986

12th Ali Awards, Gallery of Distinction, Posthumous Award, 1988

Awit Awards, Music Museum

CCP Centennial Honors for the Arts, 1999

Aliw Awards Foundation, Inc. Gawad Siglo ng Aliw

Film Academy of the Philippines, Three-time awardee

*Bayani ng Malolos sa larangan ng bilang pambansang alagad ng Musika, Gabi ng mga Bayani at Bituin ng Malolos 2013

References

1936 births
1988 deaths
Filipino classical composers
20th-century composers
Burials at the Libingan ng mga Bayani
University of Santo Tomas alumni